Matthew Whaley School is a public elementary school located in the Peacock Hill neighborhood of Williamsburg, Virginia, occupying a historic school building. It is within the Williamsburg-James City County Public Schools.

The Georgian Revival structure was built between 1929 and 1930 based on a design by noted Virginia architect Charles M. Robinson.  The monumental school building was located adjacent to the Governor's Palace in Colonial Williamsburg and "quickly became a local landmark of considerable architectural pretension."  The building's exterior features Flemish bond brickwork with glazed headers trimmed with a modillion cornice, and a hipped slate roof pierced by gables and topped with a pair of glazed cupolas.  The structure has been well preserved with little alteration.  The school was operated as a training school for the College of William and Mary and as a general public school serving students from kindergarten through twelfth grade.  In 1955, James Blair High School opened, and the Matthew Whaley School became a grammar school serving children from kindergarten through fifth grade.  From 1997 to 1998, the school underwent a $5.4 million renovation which included improvements to make the building accessible to the handicapped and refurbishing the original slate roof.

In June 2004, the Virginia Board of Historic Resources added the school to the Virginia Landmarks Register.  The building was also listed on the National Register of Historic Places in August 2004.

Matthew Whaley is part of the Williamsburg-James City County Public Schools system.

References

External links
Matthew Whaley Elementary School

Attendance boundary

National Register of Historic Places in Williamsburg, Virginia
School buildings completed in 1930
Colonial Revival architecture in Virginia
Schools in Williamsburg, Virginia
School buildings on the National Register of Historic Places in Virginia
Public elementary schools in Virginia
1930 establishments in Virginia